The Curtiss JN-6H (Model 1F) was an American biplane trainer aircraft built by Curtiss for the United States Army Air Service during World War I.

Design and development
Developed from the one-off JN-5H advanced trainer, the 6H had a superior aileron operation mechanism. It was used in a variety of roles, with stick and rudder in either one seat or both: JN-6HB single-control bomber trainer (154 built), JN-6HG-1 dual-control gunnery trainer (560 built), JN-6HG-2 single-control gunnery trainer (90 built), JN-6HO single-control observation trainer (106 built),and JN-6HP single-control pursuit trainer (125 built), a total of 1,035; five went to the Navy.

The airframe did not differ substantially from the JN-4H (Model 1E), and used the same 150 hp (112 kW) Hispano-Suiza 8A ("Hisso") V8, which weighed 408 lb (185 kg).

Some of the aircraft were modernized as the Curtiss JNH and later to the Curtiss JNS (JN Standard) with either a 180 hp (134 kW) Wright-Hispano E (as JNS-E) or 150 hp (112 kW) Wright-Hispano I engine (as JNS-I).

Variants
JN-6H
Bomber training variant
JN-6HB
Single-control bomber trainer, 154 built
JN-6HG-1
dual-control gunnery trainer, one dorsal guns, 560 built.
JN-6HG-2
single-control gunnery trainer, two dorsal guns, 90 built
JN-6HO
single-control observation trainer, 106 built
JN-6HP
Pursuit training version, 125 built.

Operators

United States Army Air Service
United States Navy

Specifications

See also

References

Notes

Bibliography

Andrade, John. U.S. Military Aircraft Designations and Serials since 1909. Hersham, Surrey, UK: Midland Counties Publications, 1979. .
Donald, David, ed. Encyclopedia of World Aircraft. Etobicoke, Ontario, Canada: Prospero Books, 1997. .
Fitzsimons, Bernard, ed. "JN-4 and JN-6, Curtiss". Illustrated Encyclopedia of 20th Century Weapons and Warfare, Volume 14. London: Phoebus Publishing, 1978.

1910s United States military trainer aircraft
JN-6H
Single-engined tractor aircraft
Biplanes
Aircraft first flown in 1918